Pyeonghae is a South Korean town. It is administered as part of Uljin County in North Gyeongsang Province.

Name
Pyeonghae's name means "Peaceful Sea(s)". It appears in 19th-century sources as "Pingai", "Pingai Harbor", and "Ping-hai Harbor".

Geography
Pyeonghae lies on the north bank of the Namdae ("Southern Great River"), about a mile inland from its confluence with the Sea of Japan on the eastern shore of the Korean Peninsula. Its harbor was formed by a conical island, which sheltered an anchorage in the Namdae estuary.

History
During the 19th century, Pyeonghae was reckoned one of the primary harbors on Korea's eastern shore.

Pyeonghae Village (Pyeonghae-ri) was officially promoted to town status on 1 December 1980.

See also
 List of towns in South Korea

References

Citations

Bibliography
 .
 .
 .

 
Towns and townships in North Gyeongsang Province